Middle Norrland is a National Area of Sweden. The National Areas are a part of the NUTS statistical regions of Sweden.

Geography
The region is situated in the north of the county, partly in the area of Sápmi. It is the second for extension and the lesser populated. It borders with Norway and the riksområden of Upper Norrland and North Middle Sweden.

The most populous cities are Sundsvall, Östersund, Örnsköldsvik and Härnösand.

Subdivision
Middle Norrland includes 2 counties: 
 Jämtland (seat: Östersund)
 Västernorrland (seat: Härnösand)

Economy 
The Gross domestic product (GDP) of the region was 17.0 billion € in 2021, accounting for 3.2% of Swedish economic output. GDP per capita adjusted for purchasing power was 29,700 € or 105% of the EU27 average in the same year. The GDP per employee was 102% of the EU average.

See also 
Sápmi
Norrland
Riksområden
NUTS of Sweden
ISO 3166-2:SE
Local administrative unit
Subdivisions of Norden

References

External links

 
National Areas of Sweden
Norrland
NUTS 2 statistical regions of the European Union